The Weekly with Wendy Mesley is a former Canadian television news series which aired on CBC Television and CBC News Network from 2018 to 2020. Hosted by Wendy Mesley, the series followed a Sunday morning talk show format to cover stories on politics as well as media and technology.

The show was announced in July 2017, and premiered on January 14, 2018.

In June 2020, Wendy Mesley was suspended from The Weekly for using an undisclosed word that "should never be used" while hosting an editorial meeting about race issues. The June 7, 2020 episode was aired without Mesley and CBC announced the suspension of the remaining two episodes planned for the season on June 12.

CBC announced the series' cancellation in September 2020.

References

2018 Canadian television series debuts
2020 Canadian television series endings
Canadian Sunday morning talk shows
CBC Television original programming
CBC News Network original programming
Television shows filmed in Toronto
2010s Canadian television news shows
2020s Canadian television news shows
2010s Canadian television talk shows
2020s Canadian television talk shows